9th meridian may refer to:

9th meridian east, a line of longitude east of the Greenwich Meridian
9th meridian west, a line of longitude west of the Greenwich Meridian